Owen John Gallacher (born 6 April 1999) is a professional footballer who plays as a left-back and winger for EFL League Two club Grimsby Town.

Gallacher is a product of the youth academies at Newcastle United and Nottingham Forest and turned professional with the latter in 2019. Having spent a spell on loan with Harrogate Town he signed a permanent deal with Burton Albion the following season before joining Crawley Town in 2021. He has since played for Gateshead on loan before being released in January 2023. Born in England, he represented Scotland at youth international level.

Club career

Early career
Born in Newcastle, Gallacher spent his early career with the youth teams of Newcastle United and Nottingham Forest, before moving on loan to Harrogate Town in January 2020, where he made his senior debut in the FA Trophy.

Burton Albion
After leaving Nottingham Forest, he signed a short-term contract with Burton Albion in September 2020 following a trial period. On 8 January 2021, Gallacher signed a contract extension to remain at the club for the remainder of the 2020–21 season.

On 12 May 2021 it was announced that he would be one of 12 players leaving Burton at the end of the season.

Crawley Town
Following his release from Burton Albion, Gallacher signed for League Two club Crawley Town on 1 July 2021 on a two-year deal with the option for a further year.

On 27 August 2022 Gallacher joined National League club Gateshead on a loan deal until 31 December 2022.

He was released by Crawley in January 2023.

Grimsby Town
He signed for Grimsby Town on 3 February 2023.

International career
Gallacher represented Scotland at under-16 and under-19 youth levels.

Career statistics

References

2000 births
Living people
Footballers from Newcastle upon Tyne
English footballers
Scottish footballers
Scotland youth international footballers
Newcastle United F.C. players
Nottingham Forest F.C. players
Harrogate Town A.F.C. players
Burton Albion F.C. players
Crawley Town F.C. players
Gateshead F.C. players
Grimsby Town F.C. players
Association football fullbacks
Association football wingers
English Football League players
National League (English football) players